Mirihana South Grama Niladhari Division is a Grama Niladhari Division of the Maharagama Divisional Secretariat  of Colombo District  of Western Province, Sri Lanka .  It has Grama Niladhari Division Code 523A.

Jubilee Post, Nugegoda, Kotte Raja Maha Vihara, Ananda Sastralaya, Kotte and Pita Kotte Gal Ambalama  are located within, nearby or associated with Mirihana South.

Mirihana South is a surrounded by the Mirihana North, Udahamulla East, Udahamulla West, Gangodavila East, Pagoda East and Pitakotte  Grama Niladhari Divisions.

Demographics

Ethnicity 

The Mirihana South Grama Niladhari Division has a Sinhalese majority (91.5%) . In comparison, the Maharagama Divisional Secretariat (which contains the Mirihana South Grama Niladhari Division) has a Sinhalese majority (95.7%)

Religion 

The Mirihana South Grama Niladhari Division has a Buddhist majority (84.9%) . In comparison, the Maharagama Divisional Secretariat (which contains the Mirihana South Grama Niladhari Division) has a Buddhist majority (92.0%)

Gallery

References 

Grama Niladhari Divisions of Maharagama Divisional Secretariat